Milicevic may refer to:

 Miličević
 Milićević